Sava Kirilov Hashamov (1940–2012) was a Bulgarian actor of theater and cinema. Honored Artist of the People's Republic of Bulgaria (1976), People's Artist of the People's Republic of Bulgaria (1984).

Biography 
He was born in Pleven.

In 1963 he graduated from the Higher Institute of Theater Arts in Sofia.

In 1963–1964 he worked in the Burgas Theater. Since 1964 he worked at the Ivan Vazov National Theatre in Sofia. For 43 seasons he played more than 100 roles (including the role of Hamlet, numerous roles in the plays of Russian and Soviet classics). Got famous as a movie actor.

In Russia and the USSR it is known as the performer of one of the main roles in the film Running on the Waves (Thomas Garvey). In 1986 he was awarded as the best actor for the role of Repetilov in Griboedov's Woe from Wit.

In 1977–1989 Secretary of the Union of Bulgarian Artists.

He was married to Soviet and Russian actress Margarita Terekhova. Hashamov is the father of four children, he has two grandchildren.

References

External links

 Савва Хашимов on KinoPoisk

1940 births
2012 deaths
People from Pleven
20th-century Bulgarian male actors
21st-century Bulgarian male actors
Bulgarian male film actors
Bulgarian male stage actors